Kevin Glendinning (born 23 January 1962) is an English former footballer who played as a left back in the Football League for Darlington.

References

1962 births
Living people
People from Corbridge
Footballers from Northumberland
English footballers
Association football defenders
Darlington F.C. players
English Football League players